The Buena Vista Oil Field, formerly the Naval Petroleum Reserve No. 2 (NPR-2) is a large oil field in Kern County, San Joaquin Valley, California in the United States. As of year end 2006 the field had a total reserve of only about one percent of its original oil, and having produced a mere . Since, the field has gone through a revitalization. Crimson Resources initiated a waterflood in the Etchegoin Formation, saw good response and sold the asset to Occidental Petroleum (now California Resources Corporation, CRC). CRC continued the development of the waterflood, but also tested the viability of the Monterey Formation. The Monterey Formation at Buena Vista has proven to be a viable target and is currently being developed.

Setting
The town of Taft is adjacent to the southwest, about halfway along the field.

Many oil fields underlie the southwestern portion of Kern County.  Adjacent to the Buena Vista field to the southwest is the enormous Midway-Sunset Oil Field, the largest in California and third-largest in the United States, and just north of the Buena Vista field is the Elk Hills Oil Field, famous for the Teapot Dome scandal as one of the illicit leases that brought corruption charges upon the administration of Warren G. Harding.

Until January 1, 1958, the Buena Vista field was considered to be part of the larger Midway-Sunset Field to the southwest; now, however, the two are considered to be geologically separate.

Geology and production

As with many of the fields in the San Joaquin Valley, the Buena Vista field is predominantly an anticline, with pools of oil trapped in rock units beneath impermeable layers. Some of the oil pools are in domes and anticlinal formations, and others are trapped in rock units due to movement of faults. No economically recoverable oil was found at this depth.

These pools were discovered in 1912, peak production was in 1925, waterflooding was attempted in the 1960s, and with most of the oil having been removed, today most operations have ceased. The Main Area of the Buena Vista Oil Field is still active, with enhanced recovery technologies such as gas injection still continuing. Peak production in the Main Area was in 1947, and has fallen off steadily since.

Most of the oil produced from the Buena Vista field is medium crude, with specific gravity of approximately 18 to 36 API.  One of the geologic units, the "Mya Gas", discovered in 1909, produces only natural gas; its year of peak production was 1919.  The discovery well for the field was in this unit, and it was the abundant presence of natural gas that convinced drillers to keep looking, as where gas was found, typically oil would be as well.

While much of the field has been abandoned, there is at least one active prospect adjacent to the old field.  An Australian company, Salinas Energy, is currently studying the possibility of commencing production.

California Historical Landmark

Buena Vista Refinery California Historical Landmark reads:
NO. 504 BUENA VISTA REFINERY - Eight miles due west of this marker stood one of California's first commercial oil refineries. Between August 1864 and April 1867, approximately 4,000 gallons of illuminating oil produced there was shipped to San Francisco by the Buena Vista Petroleum Company. Refining operations terminated due to excessive transportation rates.

See also
California Historical Landmarks in Kern County
California Historical Landmark

References
 California Oil and Gas Fields, Volumes I, II and III.  Vol. I (1998), Vol. II (1992), Vol. III (1982).  California Department of Conservation, Division of Oil, Gas, and Geothermal Resources (DOGGR).  1,472 pp.  Midway-Sunset information pp. 48-54. PDF file available on CD from www.consrv.ca.gov.
 California Department of Conservation, Oil and Gas Statistics, Annual Report, December 31, 2006.
 Salinas Energy:  Description of the South Buena Vista Prospect

Notes

External links
San Joaquin Geological Society:  The Lakeview Gusher

Natural gas fields in the United States
Oil fields in Kern County, California
Oil fields in California
Teapot Dome scandal
Naval Petroleum Reserve